Amal Aden (born 1983) is the pseudonym of a Somali–Norwegian writer. She is an author, lecturer and lesbian activist. Aden is substitute member of the Norwegian Press Complaints Commission and has been a contributor to the newspaper Dag og Tid since January 2013.

Early and personal life
Aden was born in Somalia, and became an orphan at the age of four. She was illiterate, and immigrated to Norway through family reunification as a thirteen-year-old in 1996, after living as a street child for seven years. She struggled at first with the meeting of another culture, child protection and other public services which she claims were unable to help her. She ended up in the drug environment in the Oslo city district of Grønland, and lived on the streets of the same city periodically.

Today however, she is self-employed and works as an interpreter for the police, schools and other instances, as well as being an advisor and lecturer for municipalities and other instances. She is the mother of two twins and since 2002 she has lived in Hønefoss.

Career 

Amal Aden published her first book in 2008 and has published several books since. She has received several awards, first of them Zola-prisen (a Norwegian prize named after the French writer and intellectual Émile Zola) in 2010 for her work with immigration and integration issues.

Threats 
In 2013, following her participation in the Oslo Pride Parade, Amal Aden says she received 146 threatening messages. Aden is an outspoken Muslim-lesbian activist.

Honours and recognitions
Zola Prize, 2010
The Amnesty Prize of Amnesty International Norway, 2012
Erik Bye's Memorial Prize, 2014
Gina Krog Prize of the Norwegian Association for Women's Rights, 2016

Bibliography
Aden is the author of several books:
 Se oss: bekymringsmelding fra en ung norsksomalisk kvinne. Aschehoug (2008)
 ABC i integrering: 111 gode råd om hvordan alle kan bli fullverdige borgere i det norske samfunnet. Aschehoug (2009)
 Min drøm om frihet: En selvbiografisk fortelling. Aschehoug (2009)
 Det skal merkes at de gråter: Om likestilling blant somaliere i Norge (2011)
 Om håpet glipper, er alt tapt (2012)
 Jacayl er kjærlighet på somali (2015)

References

External links

 Personal website

1983 births
Living people
Norwegian non-fiction writers
Norwegian women non-fiction writers
Somalian emigrants to Norway
21st-century pseudonymous writers
Pseudonymous women writers
Norwegian Muslims
Norwegian lesbian writers
Somalian LGBT people
Lesbian Muslims
Somalian Muslims
Somalian non-fiction writers
Somalian women writers
People from Ringerike (municipality)
21st-century Norwegian LGBT people